Hindon Airport , also spelled Hindan Airport, is a civil enclave in Ghaziabad, Uttar Pradesh, operated by the Airports Authority of India at Hindon Air Force Station of the Indian Air Force. It is the second commercial airport in the Delhi NCR after Indira Gandhi International Airport
The airport was primarily built to handle flights operating under the Government's regional connectivity scheme and hence reducing the burden of regional flights from Delhi's main airport. As of 2019, there are two airlines operating regional flights from the airport.

History

In 2017, the Ministry of Civil Aviation pre-emptively took up the idea of a civil enclave at Hindon with the IAF because slot constraints at the Indira Gandhi International Airport prevented the operation of flights under the government's Regional Connectivity Scheme called UDAN. The Hindon civil enclave would then become the second airport in the National Capital Region for flights operating under UDAN.
Commercial flight operations from an airport within 150 km of Delhi Airport were not allowed, according to an agreement signed between the government and Delhi International Airport Limited (DIAL). Hence, the MoCA made a proposal, seeking clearance from DIAL for the temporary use of Hindon for flights awarded  UDAN flights. DIAL approved the proposal in September 2017. When DIAL's on-going expansion of Delhi Airport is completed around September 2022, all UDAN operations would revert to Delhi Airport.
The Indian Air Force permitted the Civil Aviation ministry to use the air base for civil operations in August 2017.
The Uttar Pradesh government gave its approval for the project in March 2018.
AAI began construction of the terminal in August 2018. Prime Minister Narendra Modi inaugurated the passenger terminal built at a cost of  40 crores on 8 March 2019 just before model code of conduct.

The operations from Hindon were expected to begin from 15 March. However, discussions on slot timings with the Indian Air Force regarding slots took longer than expected and the date for commencement of flight operations was pushed back to the first half of October 2019.
The first commercial flight from the Hindon took off on 11 October 2019. A Beechcraft King Air, operated by Heritage Aviation under the UDAN scheme, took off for Pithoragarh Airport with nine passengers on board. 
In May 2019, it was reported that the state government and AAI were considering making the airport permanent.

Structure 
The enclave has been built on 7.5 acres at Sikandarpur village in Sahibabad, adjacent the airbase. The terminal building is a pre-engineered, air-conditioned structure with eight check-in counters. The terminal covers an area of 5,425 square metres and has a capacity of serving 300 passengers an hour. The car park can accommodate 90 cars.
Air traffic control will be provided by the Indian Air Force. The terminal has been developed by AAI while the Uttar Pradesh government has built the connecting roads and provides electricity for the project.

Airlines and destinations

Access
The closest metro stations are Dilshad Garden and Major Mohit Sharma Rajendra Nagar Metro Station [Red Line], 5 km away from Hindon Airport. Gokulpuri Metro Station situated at the Pink Line of the Delhi Metro is also close to the airport.

References

Indian Air Force bases
Airports in Uttar Pradesh
2017 establishments in Uttar Pradesh
Airports established in 2017